The Comandanti Medaglie d'Oro class were a group of 20 destroyers ordered for the  (Royal Italian Navy) during World War II. Nine had been laid down by the time of the Italian armistice in September 1943 and all but one of those ships which had not yet been laid down were cancelled. Of those that had been laid down, none had been launched by that time and all were subsequently scrapped.

Design and description
The anti-aircraft armament of the preceding  had proven inadequate as had their sustained speed and range. General Carlo Sigismondi of the Corps of Naval Engineering, assisted by Lieutenant Colonel Giuseppe Malagoli, decided upon an enlarged version of the Soldatis with 20% more horsepower and 30% more range. Perhaps the most significant change was the much more capable armament of  guns whose ability to elevate to 45 degrees gave them a limited ability to deal with low-flying aircraft and the greatly increased number of  AA guns.
 
Their crew was intended to consist of 15 officers and 262 enlisted men.

The Comandanti Medaglie d'Oros were powered by two Parsons geared steam turbines, each driving one propeller shaft using steam supplied by a trio of three-drum boilers. They were grouped together in a single compartment aft of the bridge and exhausted through a single funnel.

The propulsion machinery for the fourth ship of the third series, Comandante Esposito, was going to be rearranged to improve the survivability of the Comandanti Medaglie d'Oro class as the existing layout meant that a single hit could disable all of the boilers and immobilize the ship. At the cost of some additional length, the Italians intended to adopt the unit system of machinery in which each turbine was paired with two boilers, each in their own compartment and using their own funnel, so that one "unit" of machinery could still work if the other was knocked out.

Armament and sensors

Their main battery would have consisted of 45-caliber Cannone da 135/45 OTO Mod. 1937 guns, the number of which and distribution varied between the ships. The first series of eight ships would have had four single shielded mounts, one superfiring pair fore and aft of the superstructure. The second and third series would have had an extra single mount at the aft end of the superstructure.

The secondary armament of the first series of the Comandanti Medaglie d'Oro-class ships was provided by a dozen single mounts for 54-caliber Breda Cannone-Mitragliera da 37/54 Mod. 1939 AA guns. Its rate of fire was selectable, with settings for 60, 90 and 120 rounds per minute. The later ships were intended to have two quadruple mounts for the 37 mm guns abreast the bridge on the forecastle deck and a pair of quadruple mounts for German 65-caliber  Flakvierling AA guns on the centerline amidships. Nighttime illumination was to be provided by a pair of multi-barrel rocket launchers, one mount on each side of the bridge.

The ships would have been equipped with six  torpedo tubes for SI 270 torpedoes in two triple mounts amidships. The Italians intended to provide them with a sonar system of an unknown type for anti-submarine work. They would have been fitted with a pair of depth charge throwers and 64 depth charges. The Comandanti Medaglie d'Oros would have been able carry 52 mines as well.

The first-series ships would have been fitted with a single RM-2 gunnery director on the roof of the bridge which was equipped with an EC-3 ter  (Owl) search radar. The second series were intended to incorporate another director amidships between the torpedo tubes to control the aft guns.

Ships
The first series of eight ships was ordered on 27 September 1941 and the second series of eight ships was ordered a year later. Four ships of the third series were ordered on 7 October 1942 and another four were authorized. These last four were cancelled in April 1943 in favor of eight s. Allied bombing in 1943 damaged the facilities at the Livorno shipyard and caused two of the destroyers under construction there, Comandante Borsini and Comandante Fontana, to be reassigned to the second series while Comandante Giorgis and Comandante Giobbe were transferred to the first series. Comandante Margottini was the only ship to be launched as the Germans did it in early 1944 to make the slipway available for new construction. By August 1943 material shortages had significantly slowed the pace of building so that the launching of the third-series ships was delayed until early 1946. By this date virtually all of the material for the first series and, half of the material for the second series had been allocated. Nothing for the third ships of the third series had been ordered and they were cancelled after the Armistice.

Notes

Bibliography

External links
 Classe Comandanti Medaglie d'Oro Marina Militare website

 
Destroyer classes
Destroyers of the Regia Marina